The Handsome Fisherman (Turkish: Balikçı Güzeli) is a 1953 Turkish adventure film directed by Baha Gelenbevi and starring Cüneyt Gökçer, Ayten Çankaya and Münir Özkul.

Cast
 Cüneyt Gökçer 
 Ayten Çankaya 
 Münir Özkul 
 Nese Yulaç
 Hayri Esen
 Nezihe Becerikli 
 Ertuğrul Bilda 
 Orhan Boran 
 Gülderen Ece 
 Muzaffer Nebioğlu 
 Feridun Çölgeçen 
 Kadri Ögelman

References

Bibliography
 Giovanni Scognamillo & Metin Demirhan. Fantastik Türk sineması. Kabalcı Yayınevi, 1999.

External links
 

1953 films
1953 adventure films
1950s Turkish-language films
Turkish adventure films
Turkish black-and-white films